The Palatine Class L 2 were a group of steam locomotives used on the Palatinate Railway in early 20th century Bavaria. They were built for the line between Speyer and Neustadt an der Weinstrasse (Neustadt-Speyer railway). Because the engines were to be used double-headed, they had doors on the front and rear of the driver's cabs and an opening in the running plate. This enabled access to the locomotive from the train whilst running.

They had the numbers XIII to XVII. After the foundation of the Reichsbahn all the engines were taken over and were given the numbers 99 001 to 99 005. The first engine was retired as early as 1931, the last one in 1945.  They carried 1.4 m3 of water and 0.6 t of coal.

See also 
 Royal Bavarian State Railways 
 List of Bavarian locomotives and railbuses
 List of Palatine locomotives and railbuses

References

0-4-0T locomotives
L 2
Metre gauge steam locomotives
Railway locomotives introduced in 1903
Krauss locomotives
B n2t locomotives